Antonești may refer to:

 Antonești, a village in Călinești Commune, Teleorman County, Romania
 Antoneşti, a commune in Cantemir District, Moldova
 Antoneşti, a commune in Ștefan Vodă District, Moldova